In finance, a security interest is a legal right granted by a debtor to a creditor over the debtor's property (usually referred to as the collateral) which enables the creditor to have recourse to the property if the debtor defaults in making payment or otherwise performing the secured obligations.  One of the most common examples of a security interest is a mortgage: a person borrows money from the bank to buy a house, and they grant a mortgage over the house so that if they default in repaying the loan, the bank can sell the house and apply the proceeds to the outstanding loan.

Although most security interests are created by agreement between the parties, it is also possible for a security interest to arise by operation of law.  For example, in many jurisdictions a mechanic who repairs a car benefits from a lien over the car for the cost of repairs.  This lien arises by operation of law in the absence of any agreement between the parties.

Most security interests are granted by the person who owns the property to secure their own indebtedness.  But it is also possible for a person to grant security over their property as collateral for the debts of another person (often called third party security).  So a parent might grant a security interest over their home to support a business loan being made to their child.  Similarly, most security interests operate to secure debts or other direct financial obligations.  But sometimes a security is granted to secure a non-financial obligation.  For example, in construction a performance bond may secure the satisfactory performance of non-financial obligations.

The different types of security interest which can arise and the rights which they confer will vary from country to country.

Rationale 

A secured creditor takes a security interest to enforce its rights against collateral in case the debtor defaults on the obligation. If the debtor goes bankrupt, a secured creditor takes precedence over unsecured creditors in the distribution.

There are other reasons that people sometimes take security over assets.  In shareholders' agreements involving two parties (such as a joint venture), sometimes the shareholders .  It is sometimes suggested that banks may take floating charges over companies by way of security - not so much for the security for payment of their own debts, but because this ensures that no other bank will, ordinarily, lend to the company; thereby almost granting a monopoly in favour of the bank holding the floating charge on lending to the company.

Some economists question the utility of security interests and secured lending generally. Proponents argue that secured interests lower the risk for the lender, and in turn allows the lender to charge lower interest, thereby lowering the cost of capital for the borrower.
Detractors argue that creditors with security interests can destroy companies that are in financial difficulty, but which might still recover and be profitable. The secured lenders might get nervous and enforce the security early, repossessing key assets and forcing the company into bankruptcy.  Further, the general principle of most insolvency regimes is that creditors should be treated equally (or pari passu), and allowing secured creditors a preference to certain assets upsets the conceptual basis of an insolvency.

More sophisticated criticisms of security point out that although unsecured creditors will receive less on insolvency, they should be able to compensate by charging a higher interest rate. However, since many unsecured creditors are unable to adjust their "interest rates" upwards (tort claimants, employees), the company benefits from a cheaper rate of credit, to the detriment of these non-adjusting creditors. There is thus a transfer of value from these parties to secured borrowers.

Most insolvency law allows mutual debts to be set-off, allowing certain creditors (those who also owe money to the insolvent debtor) a pre-preferential position. In some countries, "involuntary" creditors (such as tort victims) also have preferential status, and in others environmental claims have special preferred rights for cleanup costs.

The most frequently used criticism of secured lending is that, if secured creditors are allowed to seize and sell key assets, a liquidator or bankruptcy trustee loses the ability to sell off the business as a going concern, and may be forced to sell the business on a break-up basis. This may mean realising a much smaller return for the unsecured creditors, and will invariably mean that all the employees will be made redundant.

For this reason, many jurisdictions restrict the ability of secured creditors to enforce their rights in a bankruptcy. In the U.S., the Chapter 11 creditor protection, which completely prevents enforcement of security interests, aims at keeping enterprises running at the expense of creditors' rights, and is often heavily criticised for that reason. In the United Kingdom, an administration order has a similar effect, but is less expansive in scope and restriction in terms of creditors rights. European systems are often touted as being pro-creditor, but many European jurisdictions also impose restrictions upon time limits that must be observed before secured creditors can enforce their rights. The most draconian jurisdictions in favour of creditor's rights tend to be in offshore financial centres, who hope that, by having a legal system heavily biased towards secured creditors, they will encourage banks to lend at cheaper rates to offshore structures, and thus in turn encourage business to use them to obtain cheaper funds.

Overview 

Under English law and in most common law jurisdictions derived from English law (the United States is the exception as explained below), there are nine major types of proprietary security interests:

'true' legal mortgage;
equitable mortgage;
statutory mortgage;
fixed equitable charge, or bill of sale;
floating equitable charge;
pledge, or pawn;
legal lien;
equitable lien; and
hypothecation, or trust receipt.

The United States also developed the conditional sale of personal property as another form of security interest, which is now obsolete.

Security interests at common law are either possessory or nonpossessory, depending upon whether the secured party actually needs to take possession of the collateral. Alternatively, they arise by agreement between the parties (usually by executing a security agreement), or by operation of law.

The evolution of the law of nonpossessory security interests in personal property has been particularly convoluted and messy.  Under the rule of Twyne's Case (1601) transferring an interest in personal property without also immediately transferring possession was consistently regarded as a fraudulent conveyance.  Over two hundred years would pass before such security interests were recognized as legitimate.

The following discussion of the types of security interest principally concerns English law. English law on security interests has been followed in most common law countries, and most common law countries have similar property statutes regulating the common law rules.

Types 

Security interests may be taken on any type of property. The law divides property into two classes: personal property and real property. Real property is the land, the buildings affixed to it and the rights that go with the land. Personal property is defined as any property other than real property.

"True" legal mortgage 
A legal mortgage arises when the assets are conveyed to the secured party as security for the obligations, but subject to a right to have the assets reconveyed when the obligations are performed.  This right is referred to as the "equity of redemption".  The law has historically taken a dim view of provisions which might impede this right to have the assets reconveyed (referred to as being a "clog" on the equity of redemption); although the position has become more relaxed in recent years in relation to sophisticated financial transactions.

References to "true" legal mortgages mean mortgages by the traditional common law method of transfer subject to a proviso in this manner, and references are usually made in contradistinction to either equitable mortgages or statutory mortgages.  True legal mortgages are relatively rare in modern commerce, outside of occasionally with respect to shares in companies.  In England, true legal mortgages of land have been abolished in favour of statutory mortgages.

To complete a legal mortgage it is normally necessary that title to the assets is conveyed into the name of the secured party such that the secured party (or its nominee) becomes the legal titleholder to the asset.  If a legal mortgage is not completed in this manner it will normally take effect as an equitable mortgage.  Because of the requirement to transfer title, it is not possible to take a legal mortgage over future property, or to take more than one legal mortgage over the same assets.  However, mortgages (legal and equitable) are nonpossessory security interests.  Normally the party granting the mortgage (the mortgagor) will remain in possession of the mortgaged asset.

The holder of a legal mortgage has three primary remedies in the event that there is a default on the secured obligations:

they can foreclose on the assets,
they can sell the assets, or
they can appoint a receiver over the assets.

The holder of a mortgage can also usually sue upon the covenant to pay which appears in most mortgage instruments.  There are a range of other remedies available to the holder of a mortgage, but they relate predominantly to land, and accordingly have been superseded by statute, and they are rarely exercised in practice in relation to other assets.  The beneficiary of a mortgage (the mortgagee) is entitled to pursue all of its remedies concurrently or consecutively.

Foreclosure is rarely exercised as a remedy. To execute foreclosure, the secured party needs to petition the court, and the order is made in two stages (nisi and absolute), making the process slow and cumbersome.  Courts are historically reluctant to grant orders for foreclosure, and will often instead order a judicial sale.  If the asset is worth more than the secured obligations, the secured party will normally have to account for the surplus.  Even if a court makes a decree absolute and orders foreclosure, the court retains an absolute discretion to reopen the foreclosure after the making of the order, although this would not affect the title of any third party purchaser.

The holder of a legal mortgage also has a power of sale over the assets.  Every mortgage contains an implied power of sale.  This implied power exists even if the mortgage is not under seal.  All mortgages which are made by way of deed also ordinarily contain a power of sale implied by statute, but the exercise of the statutory power is limited by the terms of the statute.  Neither implied power of sale requires a court order,  although the court can usually also order a judicial sale.  The secured party has a duty to get the best price reasonably obtainable, however, this does not require the sale to be conducted in any particular fashion (i.e. by auction or sealed bids).  What the best price reasonably obtainable will be will depend upon the market available for the assets and related considerations.  The sale must be a true sale - a mortgagee cannot sell to himself, either alone or with others, even for fair value; such a sale may be restrained or set aside or ignored.  However, if the court orders a sale pursuant to statute, the mortgagee may be expressly permitted to buy.

The third remedy is to appoint a receiver.  Technically the right to appoint a receiver can arise two different ways - under the terms of the mortgage instrument, and (where the mortgage instrument is executed as a deed) by statute.

If the mortgagee takes possession then under the common law they owe strict duties to the mortgagor to safeguard the value of the property (although the terms of the mortgage instrument will usually limit this obligation).  However, the common law rules relate principally to physical property, and there is a shortage of authority as to how they might apply to taking "possession" of rights, such as shares.  Nonetheless, a mortgagee is well advised to remain respectful of their duty to preserve the value of the mortgaged property both for their own interests and under their potential liability to the mortgagor.

Equitable mortgage 
An equitable mortgage can arise in two different ways – either as a legal mortgage which was never perfected by conveying the underlying assets, or by specifically creating a mortgage as an equitable mortgage.  A mortgage over equitable rights (such as a beneficiary's interests under a trust) will necessarily exist in equity only in any event.

Under the laws of some jurisdictions, a mere deposit of title documents can give rise to an equitable mortgage. With respect to land this has now been abolished in England, although in many jurisdictions company shares can still be mortgaged by deposit of share certificates in this manner.

Generally speaking, an equitable mortgage has the same effect as a perfected legal mortgage except in two respects.  Firstly, being an equitable right, it will be extinguished by a bona fide purchaser for value who did not have notice of the mortgage.  Secondly, because the legal title to the mortgaged property is not actually vested in the secured party, it means that a necessary additional step is imposed in relation to the exercise of remedies such as foreclosure.

Statutory mortgage 

Many jurisdictions permit specific assets to be mortgaged without transferring title to the assets to the mortgagee.  Principally, statutory mortgages relate to land, registered aircraft and registered ships.  Generally speaking, the mortgagee will have the same rights as they would have had under a traditional true legal mortgage, but the manner of enforcement is usually regulated by the statute.

Hypothecation, or "trust receipts" are relatively uncommon forms of security interest whereby the underlying assets are pledged, not by delivery of the assets as in a conventional pledge, but by delivery of a document or other evidence of title.  Hypothecation is usually seen in relation to bottomry (cf. bills of lading), whereby the bill of lading is endorsed by the secured party, who, unless the security is redeemed, can claim the property by delivery of the bill.

Equitable charge 
A fixed equitable charge confers a right on the secured party to look to (or appropriate) a particular asset in the event of the debtor's default, which is enforceable by either power of sale or appointment of a receiver.  It is probably the most common form of security taken over assets. Technically, a charge (or a "mere" charge) cannot include the power to enforce without judicial intervention, as it does not include the transfer of a proprietary interest in the charged asset. If a charge includes this right (such as private sale by a receiver), it is really an equitable mortgage (sometimes called charge by way of mortgage). Since little turns on this distinction, the term "charge" is often used to include an equitable mortgage.

An equitable charge is also a nonpossessory form of security, and the beneficiary of the charge (the chargee) does not need to retain possession of the charged property.

Where security equivalent to a charge is given by a natural person (as opposed to a corporate entity) it is usually expressed to be a bill of sale, and is regulated under applicable bills of sale legislation. Difficulties with the Bills of Sale Acts in Ireland, England and Wales have made it virtually impossible for individuals to create floating charges.

Floating charge 

Floating charges are similar in effect to fixed equitable charges once they crystallise (usually upon the commencement of liquidation proceedings against the chargor), but prior to that they "float" and do not attach to any of the chargor's assets, and the chargor remains free to deal with or dispose of them.  The U.S. equivalent is the floating lien, which unlike the floating charge, can be given by any kind of debtor, not just corporate entities.

Pledge 

A pledge (also sometimes called a pawn) is a form of possessory security, and accordingly, the assets which are being pledged need to be physically delivered to the beneficiary of the pledge (the pledgee).  Pledges are in commercial contexts used in trading companies (especially, physically, commodity trading), and are still used by pawnbrokers, which, contrary to their old world image, remain a regulated credit industry.

The pledgee has a common law power of sale in the event of a default on the secured obligations which arises if the secured obligations are not satisfied by the agreed time (or, in default of agreement, within a reasonable period of time).  If the power of sale is exercised, then the holder of the pledge must account to the pledgor for any surplus after payment of the secured obligations.

A pledge does not confer a right to appoint a receiver or foreclose.  If the holder of pledge sells or disposes of the pledged assets when not entitled to do so, they may be liable in conversion to the pledgor.

The major flaw with the pledge is that it requires physical possession by the pledgee, which traps a business pledgor in a paradox.  Unless the pledgee literally occupies the same premises as the pledger, the collateral once transferred is unavailable for the pledgor to operate its business and generate income to repay the pledgee.  Lawyers in many jurisdictions tried to get around this problem with creative devices like conditional sales and trust receipts (see below) with varying results.

Legal lien 

A legal lien, in many common law systems, includes a right to retain physical possession of tangible assets as security for the underlying obligations. In some jurisdictions it is a form of possessory security, and possession of the assets must be transferred to (and maintained by) the secured party. In the case of a possessory lien, the right is purely passive. In the case of a possessory lien, the secured party (the lienor) has no right to sell the assets - merely a right to refuse to return them until paid. In the United States, a lien can be a nonpossessory security interest.

Many legal liens arise as a matter of law (by common law or by statute). It is possible, however, to create a legal lien by contract. The courts have confirmed that it is also possible to give the secured party a power of sale in such a contract, but case law on such a power is limited and it is difficult to know what limitations and duties would be imposed on the exercise of such a power.

Equitable lien 
Equitable liens are slightly amorphous forms of security interest that arise only by operation of law in certain circumstances.  Academically it has been noted that there seems to be no real unifying principle behind the circumstances that give rise to them.

An equitable lien takes effect essentially as an equitable charge, and arises only in specified situations, (e.g. an unpaid vendor's lien in relation to property is an equitable lien; a maritime lien is sometimes thought to be an equitable lien). It is sometimes argued that where the constitutional documents of a company provide that the company has a lien over its own shares, this provision takes effect as an equitable lien, and if that analysis is correct, then it is probably the one exception to the rule that equitable liens arise by operation of law rather than by agreement.

Conditional sale 

Another form of security interest which flourished in the United States in the late 19th century and the first half of the 20th century was the conditional sale, the ancestor of what U.S. lawyers now call the purchase money security interest (PMSI). It was popular in that era among creditors for two reasons. First, most U.S. states had imposed numerous onerous restrictions upon chattel mortgages in order to protect debtors (at a time debtor's prisons were being abolished but were still within the memory of most persons then living), and second, all U.S. states in that era also had strict anti-usury laws. Conditional sales, at least initially, were seen to be free of both of those problems.

Under pressure from creditors and their lawyers, U.S. courts gradually developed a highly technical distinction between an absolute, unconditional sale, in which the seller simply became another unsecured creditor of the buyer, and a conditional sale, in which the sale of the goods was made dependent upon some condition (such as payment of the price in installments). Thus, the buyer's breach of a material condition, in turn, made it possible for the seller to declare the contract had ended, that the status quo ante should be restored, and to repossess the goods accordingly. Since the buyer had breached, he had forfeited his right to reimbursement of any portion of the price already paid, or in the alternative, those payments could be regarded as a crude form of rent for the use of the goods.

As conditional sales became popular for financing industrial equipment and consumer goods, U.S. state legislatures began to regulate them as well during the early 20th century, with the result that they soon became almost as complex as the older forms of security interests which they had been used to evade.

Security interest vs. general obligation 
Some obligations are backed only by a security interest against specific designated property, and liability for repayment of the debt is limited to the property itself, with no further claim against the obligor.  These are referred to as "nonrecourse obligations".

Other obligations (i.e., recourse obligations) are backed by the full credit of the borrower. If the borrower defaults, then the creditor can force the obligor into bankruptcy and the creditors will divide all assets of the obligor.

Depending on the relative credit of the obligor, the quality of the asset, and the availability of a structure to separate the obligations of the asset from the obligations of the obligor, the interest rate charged on one may be higher or lower than the other.

Perfection 

Perfection of security interests means different things to lawyers in different jurisdictions.
 in English law, perfection has no defined statutory or judicial meaning, but academics have pressed the view that it refers to the attachment of the security interest to the underlying asset.  Others have argued cogently that attachment is a separate legal concept, and that perfection refers to any steps required to ensure that the security interest is enforceable against third parties.
 in American law, perfection is generally taken to refer to any steps required to ensure that the security interest remains enforceable against other creditors or other parties, including a bankruptcy trustee in the case of the debtor's bankruptcy.

The second definition is becoming more frequently used commercially, and arguably is to be preferred, as the traditional English legal usage has little purpose except in relation to the comparatively rare true legal mortgage (very few other security interests require additional steps to attach to the asset. Security interests frequently require some form of registration to be enforceable in connection with the chargor's insolvency).

"Quasi-security" 
There are a number of other arrangements which parties can put in place which have the effect of conferring security in a commercial sense, but do not actually create a proprietary security interest in the assets.  For example, it is possible to grant a power of attorney or conditional option in favour of the secured party relating to the subject matter, or to utilise a retention of title arrangement, or execute undated transfer instruments.  Whilst these techniques may provide protection for the secured party, they do not confer a proprietary interest in the assets which the arrangements relate to, and their effectiveness may be limited if the debtor goes into bankruptcy.

It is also possible to replicate the effect of security by making an outright transfer of the asset, with a provision that the asset is re-transferred once the secured obligations are repaid.  In some jurisdictions, these arrangements may be recharacterised as the grant of a mortgage, but most jurisdictions tend to allow the parties freedom to characterise their transactions as they see fit.  Common examples of this are financings using a stock loan or repo agreement to collateralise the cash advance, and title transfer arrangements (for example, under the "Transfer" form English Law credit support annex to an ISDA Master Agreement (as distinguished from the other forms of CSA, which grant security)).

The law in different jurisdictions

European Union

The laws relating to taking and enforcing security vary by country, and depend on whether it derives from common law or civil law.

In the European Union, the Financial Collateral Arrangements Directive provides for appropriation as a remedy for securing financial collateral. In the United Kingdom, this has been introduced under the Financial Collateral Arrangements (No.2) Regulations 2003 where the assets subject to the mortgage are "financial collateral" and the mortgage instrument provides that the regulations apply.  Appropriation is a means whereby the mortgagee can take title to the assets, but must account to the mortgagor for their fair market value (which must be specified in the mortgage instrument), but without the need to obtain any court order. In 2009, the Judicial Committee of the Privy Council ruled that as a matter of English law:

Appropriation is much closer to sale than it is to foreclosure. It is in effect a sale by the collateral-taker to himself, at a price determined by an agreed valuation process.
It is not necessary, for a valid appropriation, for the collateral-taker to become a registered holder of the shares.
Commercial practicalities require that there should be an overt act evincing the intention to exercise a power of appropriation, communicated to the collateral-provider.

The principles under which equitable relief may be sought, where appropriation has been exercised under English law, were expressed in 2013 in Cukurova Finance International Ltd v Alfa Telecom Turkey Ltd.

United States (the Uniform Commercial Code)

In the late 1940s, the United States (U.S.) legal community arrived at a consensus that the traditional common law distinctions were obsolete and served no useful purpose.  They tended to generate too much unnecessary litigation about whether the creditor had selected the correct type of security interest.  There was a growing recognition that the different types of security interests had developed only because on the one hand, many judges thought there was something inherently wrong with allowing a person, either out of desperation or foolishness, to summarily encumber all his or her personal property as collateral for a loan, but on the other, debtors and creditors would attempt to reach a desired result by any means necessary, even if that meant resorting to creating multiple security interests to cover different types of personal property. There was also the problem of the above-mentioned early English cases that regarded such security interests as fraudulent conveyances and failed to recognize that they had legitimate uses in a modern industrial economy.  Therefore, because the very history of security interests demonstrated that judicial resistance to enforcing broad security interests would not stop debtors from trying to give them as inducement to creditors to extend financing, and that they were socially useful under the proper circumstances, the better choice was to make the law of security interests as clear and simple as possible.

The result was Article 9 of the Uniform Commercial Code (UCC), which regulates security interests in personal property (as opposed to real property) and establishes a unified concept of a security interest as a right in a debtor's property that secures payment or performance of an obligation.

Article 9 was subsequently enacted, although not entirely without variations, by the 50 states, District of Columbia, and most territories.

Under Article 9, a security interest is created by a security agreement, under which the debtor grants a security interest in the debtor's property as collateral for a loan or other obligation.

A security interest grants the holder a right to take a remedial action with respect to the property, upon occurrence of certain events, such as the non-payment of a loan. The creditor may take possession of such property in satisfaction of the underlying obligation. The holder will sell such property at a public auction or through a private sale, and apply the proceeds to satisfy the underlying obligation. If the proceeds exceed the amount of the underlying obligation, the debtor is entitled to the excess. If the proceeds fall short, the holder of the security interest is entitled to a deficiency judgment whereby the holder can institute additional legal proceedings to recover the full amount unless it is a non-recourse debt like many mortgage loans in the United States.

In the U.S. the term "security interest" is often used interchangeably with "lien". However, the term "lien" is more often associated with the collateral of real property than with of personal property.

A security interest is typically granted by a "security agreement". The security interest is established with respect to the property, if the debtor has an ownership interest in the property and the holder of the security interest conferred value to the debtor, such as giving a loan.

The holder may "perfect" the security interest to put third parties on notice thereof. Perfection is typically achieved by filing a financing statement with government, often the secretary of state located at a jurisdiction where a corporate debtor is incorporated. Perfection can also be obtained by possession of the collateral, if the collateral is tangible property.

Absent perfection, the holder of the security interest may have difficulty enforcing his rights in the collateral with regard to third parties, including a trustee in bankruptcy and other creditors who claim a security interest in the same collateral.

If the debtor defaults (and does not file for bankruptcy), the UCC offers the creditor the choice of either suing the debtor in court or conducting a disposition by either public or private sale.  UCC dispositions are designed to be held by private parties without any judicial involvement, although the debtor and other secured creditors of the debtor have the right to sue the creditor conducting the disposition if it is not conducted in a "commercially reasonable" fashion to maximize proceeds from the sale of the collateral.

Article 9 is limited in scope to personal property and fixtures (i.e., personal property attached to real property).  Security interests in real property continue to be governed by non-uniform laws (in the form of statutory law or case law or both) which vary dramatically from state to state.  In a slight majority of states, the deed of trust is the primary instrument for taking a security interest in real property, while the mortgage is used in the remainder. The Uniform Law Commission's attempt during the 1970s to encourage the enactment of uniform land transaction laws was a catastrophic failure.

Commonwealth

As noted above, UCC Article 9's core insight was that the traditional distinctions were hopelessly obsolete, which was highly influential elsewhere and inspired the enactment of the Personal Property Security Acts throughout Canada during the 1990s.  Although Ontario was the first province to enact such a law in 1990, all other Canadian provinces and territories followed the example set by Saskatchewan's PPSA enacted in 1993.  The PPSAs are generally similar to UCC Article 9. However, they differ substantially on several issues such as the treatment of rental property, and the effectiveness of a financing statement after a debtor changes its name. Quebec has not enacted a PPSA but the sections of the 1994 Quebec Civil Code governing hypothecs were clearly influenced by the PPSAs and Article 9, and the province has made further amendments to the Civil Code to make possible more types of transactions that are already available in Article 9 jurisdictions. 

In turn, international development experts recognized in the mid-1990s that reform of the law of security interests was a major reason for the prosperity of both Canada and United States, in that it had enabled their businesses to finance growth through forms of secured lending which simply did not exist elsewhere.  The International Monetary Fund, the World Bank, and other international lenders began to encourage other countries to follow Canada's example as part of the structural adjustment process (a consultation process often required as a condition of their loans). The Canadian PPSAs were subsequently followed by the New Zealand Personal Property Securities Act 1999, the Vanuatu Personal Property Securities Act 2008, the Australia Personal Property Securities Act 2009, the Papua New Guinea Personal Property Security Act 2012, the Jersey Security Interests Law 2012 (covering intangible personal property only), the Samoa Personal Property Securities Act 2013, and the Jamaica Security Interests in Personal Property Act 2013.   

The Canadian, New Zealand and Australian acts all followed the UCC's pragmatic "function over form" approach and borrowed extensive portions of Article 9's terminology and framework.  However, New Zealand, as a unitary state, only needed to enact one act for the whole country and was able to create a single nationwide "register" for security interests.  While the U.S. enacted Article 9 at the state level and Canada enacted its PPSAs at the provincial level, Australia, another common law federation, deliberately implemented its new security interest law at the federal level in order to supersede over 70 state laws and create a national register similar to New Zealand's.

Civil law

The first major attempt to bring the benefits of UCC Article 9 to civil law jurisdictions was launched by the European Bank for Reconstruction and Development in 1992, which resulted in the EBRD Model Law for Secured Transactions in 1994.  However, the EBRD Model Law's approach to the entire subject differed radically from UCC Article 9, and it was also quite limited. For example, it did not have provisions for purchase money security interests. Nearly all Central and Eastern European countries undertook reform of their secured transactions laws in the 1990s and 2000s, although most of them either came up with ad hoc indigenous solutions or followed the EBRD Model Law to some extent. Only Albania, Kosovo, and Montenegro attempted to closely follow the UCC Article 9 approach. 

In 2002, the Organization of American States promulgated the Model Inter-American Law on Secured Transactions, in response to a rapidly growing body of empirical evidence that the chronic failure of Latin America's legal systems to support modern asset-based financing is a primary reason for the region's economic instability.  The OAS Model Law attempted to import many of the best parts of UCC Article 9 into the Latin American civil law sphere, but with extensive revisions for that region's unique problems. The OAS Model Law has been enacted to some extent in several countries, including Mexico (2000, 2003, and 2010), Peru (2006), Guatemala (2007), and Honduras (2009). 

To date, only Honduras has been able to fully enact and actually implement the OAS Model Law in a manner faithful to the spirit of UCC Article 9, in the sense of unifying security interests and making them easily visible on a public registry.  At the launch of the Pathways to Prosperity in the Americas initiative in San Jose, Costa Rica on March 4, 2010, then-U.S. Secretary of State Hillary Clinton stressed that "the United States is committed to working with our Pathways partners to modernize laws that govern lending so that small and medium size businesses can use assets other than real estate as collateral for loans," and generously praised Honduras for its aggressive reform efforts.  

Separately, after the issue of secured transactions reform was recommended to the United Nations Commission on International Trade Law in 2000 by the Secretary-General, UNCITRAL eventually prepared a Legislative Guide on Secured Transactions as a recommendation to all countries, which ended up structured as a "political compromise" between "sharply divergent" legal systems.  Therefore, although it was obviously inspired by UCC Article 9, the Legislative Guide did not closely conform to Article 9's terminology or structure.  The Legislative Guide uses different terminology for even the most basic concepts. For example, it uses the term "security right" in lieu of "security interest".  On December 11, 2008, the Guide was subsequently endorsed by the 67th plenary meeting of the United Nations General Assembly in Resolution 63/121, which took effect January 15, 2009.

See also 

 Collateral
 Debenture
 Floating charge
 Hypothec
 Lien
 Ship hypothec
 Mortgage law
 Negative pledge
 Nonrecourse debt
 Perfection (law)
 Pledge
 Quistclose trust
 Second lien financing
 Secured transaction
 Tacking (law)
 Uniform Commercial Code

Notes

References

Further reading

External links
Department of Business Small Firm Loan Guarantee scheme in the UK

Financial risk
Financial law
Business law
Property law
English law
Contract law
Bankruptcy